Wu Di and Yi Chu-huan were the defending champions but chose not to compete together. Wu played alongside Zhang Zhizhen. Yi teamed up with Hsieh Cheng-peng. Wu lost in the quarterfinals to Gao Xin and Li Zhe.

Yi successfully defended his title, defeating Gao and Li 7–6(8–6), 5–7, [10–0] in the final.

Seeds

Draw

References
 Main Draw

Shanghai Challenger - Doubles
2016 Doubles
2016 in Chinese tennis